The Children's Hospital at Westmead (formerly Royal Alexandra Hospital for Children) is a children's hospital in Western Sydney. The hospital was founded in 1880 as "The Sydney Hospital for Sick Children". Its name was changed to the "Royal Alexandra Hospital for Children" on 4 January 1904 when King Edward VII granted use of the appellation ‘Royal’ and his consort, Queen Alexandra, consented to the use of her name.

It is one of three children's hospitals in New South Wales. It is currently located on Hawkesbury Road in Westmead and is affiliated with the University of Sydney.

On 1 July 2010, it became part of the newly formed The Sydney Children's Hospitals Network (Randwick and Westmead) incorporating the Royal Alexandra Hospital for Children.

Name and relocation 
The hospital was opened in 1880 as the Sydney Hospital for Sick Children after Mrs Jessie Campbell-Browne, wife of the Member for Singleton, gathered together in 1878 a group of women to discuss the merits of establishing a children's hospital in Sydney. It soon outgrew the small building in which it was housed at Glebe Point. In 1906 it moved to a much grander building, designed by Harry Kent in Camperdown, where it stayed for 89 years, where it was known as the Camperdown Children's Hospital.

In 1995, the hospital was relocated to its current location in Westmead to better serve the growing populations of Western Sydney.

This relocation involved amalgamation with most of the paediatric services of nearby Westmead Hospital (apart from neonates) to form a new hospital with a new name; initially "The New Children's Hospital" and more recently "The Children's Hospital at Westmead". The official name of the hospital; the "Royal Alexandra Hospital for Children" is retained.

Services
The Children's Hospital at Westmead is one of the busiest Children's Hospitals in New South Wales seeing over 80,000 patients annually. See their official website for services, units and departments.

Controversies 

On 7 February 2023, a team of doctors at Westmead led by Joseph Elkadi, Catherine Chudleigh, and Ann M. Maguire published a controversial article in the pediatric journal 'Children' which purported to examine the developmental pathway and clinical outcomes of 79 transgender children who presented at the hospital's gender service.  Despite a broad medical consensus of the world's largest medical associations, the authors sensationally concluded that gender affirming healthcare is, in effect, "iatrogenic” and a “non-standard risky approach”.  Their conclusions were widely repeated in numerous articles in the Australian right-wing press exciting "legal and safety fears" over gender-affirming healthcare.  The press coverage also attracted several thousand highly pejorative public comments about gender diverse children and adults, and their treating physicians.  

Westmead's study was subsequently analysed and refuted by the peak body for transgender healthcare in Australia, the Australian New Zealand Professional Association for Transgender Health (AusPATH) in a response letter dated 1 March, 2023.  The letter accused the study's authors of "significant bias" and identified a range of methodological flaws and misrepresentations in the Westmead team's study.  AusPATH also accused Westmead's authors of using "discredited literature" and citing fringe medical groups such as the "National Association of Practicing Psychiatrists", which is widely considered to be a medico-religious lobby group associated with the Australian Christian Lobby.  The study's authors were also criticised for using "de-humanising" anti-trans language and for "pathologising" gender diversity in a discriminatory way.

Several LGBTI Human Rights Groups pointed out that the study runs counter to the NSW Health Strategy for transgender young people, and questioned whether Westmead was fit to continue treating transgender children and adolescents in a non-discriminatory and therapeutically beneficial way.

Notable doctors and board members
Some notable individuals connected to the history of the Children's Hospital are:
 Sir Lorimer Dods LVO (1900–1981), paediatrician, who founded, with assistance from Dr John Fulton and Douglas Burrows, the Children's Medical Research Foundation.
 Sir Charles Clubbe (1854–1932), was the President of the hospital's Board of Management from 1904 until 1932, can perhaps be called the father of the Children's Hospital and is sometimes also mentioned as one of the fore-fathers of Australian orthopaedic surgery. Sir Charles Clubbe has a ward named after him.
 Sir Robert Blakeley Wade (1874–1954), orthopaedic surgeon.  A new building Wade House was named in his honour in 1939, with pictures of Australian fauna drawn on many walls by artist Pixie O'Harris.
 Dr Margaret Harper (1879–1964), paediatrician, who discovered the difference between coeliac disease and cystic fibrosis of the pancreas in 1930.
 Sir Norman Gregg (1892–1966), ophthalmologist, was the first person to identify German measles as a cause for congenital deformities.
 Dr Lindsay Dey CBE (1886–1973), paediatrician, was the President of the hospital's Board of Management from 1946 until 1959.
 Dr Frank Tidswell (1867–1941), microbiologist, was the Director of Pathology from 1913 until 1941.
 Dr. R. Douglas Reye (1912–1977), fellow of the Royal Australasian College of Physicians, after whom Reye's syndrome was named, worked at the hospital from 1939 until his death.
 Dr Marcel Sofer–Schreiber (1910–1994) [MRCS & FRCS 1938, MB BS Sydney 1931, FRACS] paediatric neurosurgeon, led the way in Australia in the treatment of hydrocephalus, using the Spitz–Holter shunt in the 1960s. He went on to train many doctors to carry out this procedure, thus saving the lives of countless babies, and leaving a lasting legacy. He published extensively on his specialty with papers on hydrocephalus, head injuries and spinal tumours. He was also the first surgeon to draw attention to the potentially deadly condition of subdural haematoma in infants.

Notable patients 
Some notable individuals connected to the history of the Children's Hospital are:
Francis Chan (born in 1991) – the youngest liver transplant patient in Australia at three months old.  He underwent two transplants three days apart as the first transplant failed until the last-minute call came in time for another transplant to save his life.
Sophie Delezio (born in 2001) – treated at the hospital after being badly injured in a car crash at two years old. She suffered burns to 85% of her body but survived and was released from hospital six months later in June 2004.

Adolescent health
The Adolescent Medicine at The Children's Hospital at Westmead seeks to improve the health and wellbeing of young people aged 12–24. The key focus areas include developing information and resources; capacity building to increase workers’ skills and confidence in adolescent health; supporting applied research; advocacy & policy development to increase leadership and action for adolescent health.

See also
 Lists of hospitals
 List of hospitals in Australia
Healthcare in Australia
 Sydney Children's Hospital
 Westmead Hospital

References 

Children's hospitals in Australia
Teaching hospitals in Australia
Hospitals in Sydney
Hospital buildings completed in 1906
Government agencies of New South Wales
Organisations based in Australia with royal patronage
Hospitals established in 1880
1880 establishments in Australia
Sydney Medical School
Camperdown, New South Wales